The Adour is a river in southwestern France. It rises in High-Bigorre (Pyrenees), in the commune of Aspin-Aure, and flows into the Atlantic Ocean (Bay of Biscay) near Bayonne. At its final stretch, i.e. on its way through Bayonne and a short extent upstream, the river draws the border between the Northern Basque Country and Landes regions.

Places along the river 

Départements and towns along the river include:
 Hautes-Pyrénées: Bagnères-de-Bigorre, Tarbes, Maubourguet
 Gers: Riscle
 Landes: Aire-sur-l'Adour, Dax, Tarnos
 Pyrénées-Atlantiques: Bayonne

Tributaries 

The main tributaries of the Adour are, from source to mouth:
 Adour de Gripp (also Adour du Tourmalet, 15 km)
 Adour de Lesponne (19 km)
 Échez (64 km)
 Arros (130 km)
 Léez (56 km)
 Gabas (117 km)
 Midouze (151 km)
 Louts (86 km)
 Luy (154 km)
 Gave de Pau (191 km)
 Bidouze (82 km)
 Aran (48 km)
 Ardanabia (26 km)
 Nive (79 km)

References

External links 

 Commission Européenne—Natura 2000: Cartographie du Barthes de l'Adour—  — maps of the Adour and Adour Basin.
 Natura 2000 Sites d'Intérêt Communautaire par la France: Barthes de l'Adour — 
 Adour — — website homepage.
 European Commission: official Natura 2000 Network website— — "the centrepiece of EU nature & biodiversity policy."

 01
Rivers of Nouvelle-Aquitaine
Rivers of Occitania (administrative region)
Natura 2000 in France
Rivers of Gers
Rivers of Hautes-Pyrénées
Rivers of Landes (department)
Rivers of Pyrénées-Atlantiques
Rivers of France
Protected areas of the Pyrenees